Persatuan Sepakbola Indonesia Kota Metro or Persikomet is an Indonesian football team based in Metro, Lampung. They currently compete in Liga 3.

Honours
 U-15 Soeratin Cup Lampung
 Champion: 2018
 Liga 3 Lampung
 Runner-up: 2021

References

External links

Metro (city)
Lampung
Football clubs in Indonesia
Football clubs in Lampung
1999 establishments in Indonesia
Association football clubs established in 1999